Bešeňov is a municipality and village in the Nové Zámky District in the Nitra Region of south-west Slovakia.

History
In the 9th century, the territory of Bešeňov became part of the Kingdom of Hungary. In historical records the village was first mentioned in 1075.
After the Austro-Hungarian army disintegrated in November 1918, Czechoslovak troops occupied the area, later acknowledged internationally by the Treaty of Trianon. Between 1938 and 1945 Bešeňov once more became part of Miklós Horthy's Hungary through the First Vienna Award. From 1945 until the Velvet Divorce, it was part of Czechoslovakia. Since then it has been part of Slovakia.

Geography
The village lies at an altitude of 121 metres and covers an area of 17.096 km2. It has a population of about 1726 people.

Ethnicity
The population is about 80% Hungarian and 20% Slovak.

Facilities
The village has a public library, gym, football team and table-tennis team. It has three pubs and two bars. A small medical centre is also run by the village.

Genealogical resources

The records for genealogical research are available at the state archive "Statny Archiv in Nitra, Slovakia" 
 Roman Catholic church records (births/marriages/deaths): 1787-1925 (parish A)
 Reformated church records (births/marriages/deaths): 1784-1870 (parish B)

See also
 List of municipalities and towns in Slovakia

External links
https://web.archive.org/web/20071217080336/http://www.statistics.sk/mosmis/eng/run.html
Surnames of living people in Besenov
Bešeňov – Nové Zámky okolie

Villages and municipalities in Nové Zámky District